The Concorde District is a high school district in the state of Virginia that includes public schools  from Fairfax County. It is widely regarded as one of the most competitive districts in the Virginia High School League (VHSL).

History
The Concorde District was founded in 1993 as part the realignment of the Northern Region.  The charter members of the district, which began playing in the 1994-1995 school year, were Centreville, Chantilly, Herndon, Thomas Jefferson, Oakton, South Lakes, and W.T. Woodson, all of Fairfax County.  All seven schools were among the largest schools in the Northern Region at the time, playing Division 6 football.

1997–1999
In 1997, Potomac Falls High School of Loudoun County opened and joined the Concorde District due to its proximity to its member schools. It was not competitive because its size which was well below the AA/AAA cutoff, and also because it was new. Potomac Falls moved to the Northwestern District in 1999, and W.T. Woodson moved to the Liberty District This reunited it with crosstown rival Fairfax which dropped the Concorde to six schools.

2000–present 
In 2000, Westfield opened and joined the Concorde, making it the second newly established school to join the district.  South Lakes left the Concorde in 2003 to the Liberty due to declining enrollment, and Thomas Jefferson was allowed to play in the National District for football while remaining in the Concorde for other sports.

In 2005, Thomas Jefferson moved to the Liberty, while Fairfax moved to the Concorde, and Robinson moved from the Patriot to the Concorde District.  In 2009, Fairfax returned to the Liberty. In 2017 as part of a realignment by the VHSL, Robinson and founding member Herndon left the Concorde District as Robinson returned the Patriot District and Herndon moved to the Liberty District. James Madison, a long-standing member of the Liberty District, was added to the district.

In 2021 South Lakes left the Liberty District to re-join the Concorde District.

Membership history

Current members
Centreville Wildcats of Clifton
Chantilly Chargers of Chantilly
James Madison Warhawks of Vienna
Oakton Cougars of Oakton
South Lakes Seahawks of Reston
Westfield Bulldogs of Chantilly

Former members
Fairfax Rebels of Fairfax (2005-2009)
Herndon Hornets of Herndon (1993-2017)
Potomac Falls Panthers of Sterling (1997-1999)
Robinson Rams of Fairfax (2005-2017)
Thomas Jefferson Colonials of Alexandria (1993-2005)
W.T. Woodson Cavaliers of Fairfax (1993-1999)

Current Athletic Concorde District Champions

Fall '22 Sports Champions
Cheerleading: Chantilly
Boys Cross Country: Oakton
Girls Cross County: Oakton
Field Hockey: South Lakes
Football: James Madison
Golf: Westfield
Volleyball: Chantilly

Winter '22-23 Sports Champions
Boys Basketball:
Girls Basketball: Oakton
Girls Gymnastics: 
Boys Swimming: 
Girls Swimming: 
Boys Indoor Track: 
Girls Indoor Track: 
Wrestling: 

Spring '23 Sports Champions
Baseball: 
Boys Lacrosse: 
Girls Lacrosse: 
Boys Soccer: 
Girls Soccer: 
Softball: 
Boys Tennis: 
Girls Tennis: 
Boys Track: 
Girls Track:

Northern Region championships won by Concorde District schools

Boys Basketball: Centreville (2020, 2021), Westfield (2015, 2016), Chantilly (1992?)
Football: Madison (2020, 2021), Westfield (2003, 2007, 2015, 2016, 2017, 2018, 2019), Centreville (1998, 1999, 2000, 2011, 2013, 2014), Oakton (2012), Chantilly (1996, 2006)
Softball: Centreville (2000)
Girls Soccer: Centreville (2006, 2007)
Field Hockey: Madison (2020), Centreville (2000, 2001)

Golf: Centreville (1995, 1996, 2001, 2002) 
Boys Indoor Track and Field: Centreville (2002)
Baseball: Madison (2020, 2021), Westfield (2019), Chantilly (2016), Oakton (2007)
Girls Basketball: Madison (2020, 2021, 2022), Oakton (2012)
Boys Basketball: Westfield (2015, 2016)

Volleyball: Chantilly (2022) 
Cheerleading: Chantilly (2022)

State championships won by Concorde District schools

References 

https://www.district1va.org/g5-bin/client.cgi?G5genie=1167

Virginia High School League